Rohan Bopanna and Daniel Nestor were the defending champions, but chose not to compete together. Nestor teamed up with Marcelo Melo, but lost in the quarterfinals to Łukasz Kubot and Marcin Matkowski.

Bopanna played alongside Florin Mergea, but lost in the final to Jamie Murray and Bruno Soares, 3–6, 6–7(6–8).

Seeds

Draw

Draw

References
 Main Draw

M